Jaww is a village on the south eastern coast of Bahrain, and has traditionally been home to the Al Bu Romaih tribe. Bahrain's main prison is located near the village.

Populated places in Bahrain